The Serbian First League (Serbian: Prva liga Srbije) is the second-highest football league in Serbia. The league is operated by the Serbian FA. 16 teams competed in the league for the 2014–15 season. Two teams will be promoted to the Serbian SuperLiga while the 3rd placed team will play in the play-offs against the 14th team in the SuperLiga. Four teams will be relegated to the Serbian League, the third-highest division overall in the Serbian football league system. The season begun in August 2014 and ended in May 2015.

2014–15 teams

League table

Results

Top goalscorers

Including matches played on 23 May 2015; Source: Prva liga official website

* Player's name in italic indicates that the player is not playing in the league anymore.

Hat-tricks

References

External links
 Official website

Serbian First League seasons
2014–15 in Serbian football leagues
Serbia